The Museum of Weapons & Early American History was located in St. Augustine, Florida in the United States. The museum, located at the intersection of King and Granada streets, was home to a collection of guns, swords, pictures and lithographs dating from 1500 to 1900. The museum also included collections of muskets, shipwreck artifacts, period documents, Native American artifacts, and a Civil War display.

External links 
 official website

Museums in St. Augustine, Florida
Military and war museums in Florida
Defunct museums in Florida
1986 establishments in Florida